Ecevit is a Turkish surname. Notable people with the surname include:

 Bülent Ecevit (1925–2006), Turkish politician, poet, writer and journalist
 Nazlı Ecevit (1900–1985), Turkish female painter and mother of Bülent Ecevit
 Rahşan Ecevit (1923–2020), spouse of the late Turkish politician and former prime minister Bülent Ecevit

Turkish-language surnames